The leader of the House of Lords is a member of the Cabinet of the United Kingdom who is responsible for arranging government business in the House of Lords. The post is also the leader of the majority party in the House of Lords who acts as the government party chairperson in the house. The role is always held in combination with a formal Cabinet position, usually one of the sinecure offices of Lord President of the Council, Lord Keeper of the Privy Seal or Chancellor of the Duchy of Lancaster. Unless the Leader is also a departmental minister, being Leader constitutes the bulk of their government responsibilities, but it has never been an independent salaried office. The Office of the Leader of the House of Lords is a ministerial department.

Though the leader of the House is a member of the cabinet and remains a partisan figure, the leader also has responsibilities to the House as a whole. In contrast to the House of Commons, where proceedings are controlled by the speaker, proceedings in the Lords are controlled by peers themselves, under the rules set out in the Standing Orders. The leader of the House has the responsibility of reminding the House of these rules and facilitating the Lords' self-regulation, though any member may draw attention to breaches of order or failure to observe customs. The Leader is often called upon to advise on procedures and points of order and is required to determine the order of speakers on Supplementary Questions, subject to the wishes of the House. However, like the Lord Speaker, the Leader of the House has no power to rule on points of order or to intervene during an inappropriate speech.

Until the election of the first Lord Speaker on 4 July 2006, the Leader of the House had responsibility for making preliminary decisions on requests for Private Notice Questions and for waiving the sub judice rule in certain cases. Those functions were transferred to the Lord Speaker.

History
The title seems to have come into use some time after 1800, as a formal way of referring to the peer who managed government business in the upper House, irrespective of which salaried position they held in the cabinet. However, it may have been used as early as 1689, applied to George Savile, 1st Marquess of Halifax, when he was Speaker of the House of Lords during the Convention Parliament of that year.

The role developed during the first quarter of the eighteenth century, at the same time as the role of Prime Minister and the system of Cabinet government. In the wake of the English Civil War, the Glorious Revolution and the succession of the Hanoverians to the throne, Britain evolved a system of government where ministers were sustained in office by their ability to carry legislation through Parliament. It was therefore necessary for a member of the government to take responsibility for steering government legislation through each House.

The Earl of Sunderland initiated aspects of the role during the Whig Junto under Queen Anne. Sunderland and the other Whigs were dismissed from office in reaction to their co-ordination of government matters, which was taken as a threat to the power of the monarch. Sunderland returned to power under George I, as Lord Privy Seal. The first documentary evidence of the existence of the role comes from 1717, when Sunderland became Secretary of State for the Northern Department: in the form of lists of peers invited to the office of the Northern Secretary immediately before sessions of Parliament.

When the Prime Minister sat in the House of Lords, which was common until the beginning of the twentieth century, he usually held the position of Leader of the House of Lords. When the Prime Minister sat in the Commons, the position of Leader of the Lords was often held by the Foreign Secretary or Colonial Secretary. In some coalition governments, it was held by the party leader who was not Prime Minister.

Since the end of the Marquess of Salisbury's last government, in 1902, the position clearly exists in its own right as a member of the cabinet. Since 1966 it has only been combined with sinecure positions and the holder has not been a departmental minister though some have held additional responsibilities such as Quintin Hogg, 2nd Viscount Hailsham also being designated "Minister for Science" or Margaret Baroness Jay also being "Minister for Women". The first female Leader of the Lords was Janet Young, Baroness Young in 1981–1983.  Lord Peart, Viscount Whitelaw and Lord Wakeham served as Leader of the Lords having previously been Leader of the House of Commons.

Families
 Robert Gascoyne-Cecil, 3rd Marquess of Salisbury served as Leader of the House of Lords from 1885 to 1886, from 1886 to 1892 and from 1895 to 1902. His son James Gascoyne-Cecil, 4th Marquess of Salisbury served as Leader from 1925 to 1929. His son in turn, Robert Gascoyne-Cecil, 5th Marquess of Salisbury served as Leader first from 1942 to 1945 as Viscount Cranborne by means of a writ of acceleration, and as the Marquess of Salisbury from 1951 to 1957. His grandson, Robert Gascoyne-Cecil, 7th Marquess of Salisbury, served as Leader from 1994 to 1997, as Viscount Cranborne, again by means of a writ of acceleration.
 Douglas Hogg, 1st Viscount Hailsham served as Leader of the House of Lords from 1931 to 1935. His son Quintin Hogg, 2nd Viscount Hailsham served as Leader from 1960 to 1963.

Responsibilities
Management and delivery of the Government's legislative programme (through the House of Lords) and facilitating the passage of individual bills. 
Leading the House (in the Chamber and as a key member of domestic committees to do with procedure, conduct, and the internal governance of the House).
Issues connected to the House of Lords and its governance.
Speaking for the Government in the Chamber on a range of issues, including repeating in the House of Lords statements made to the Commons by the Prime Minister. 
Ceremonial and other duties as the Lord Keeper of the Privy Seal.

List
Because the post is a parliamentary one and not a ministerial office in its own right, it is not always included in official lists of government offices, especially for earlier periods. This can make it difficult to determine who the Leader of the House of Lords was in a particular ministry.

Deputy Leaders
The following peers have served as Deputy Leaders of the House of Lords since 1963:

See also
 House of Lords
 Leader of the House of Commons

References

External links
 Leader of the House of Lords Official site
 UK Parliamentary Archives, Records of the Leader of the House of Lords

 
1717 establishments in Great Britain
Lords
House of Lords